Rain is a slice-of-life webcomic first published in November 2010 by Jocelyn Samara DiDomenick. It follows a teenage trans girl named Rain Flaherty as she attends a private Catholic high school and interacts with the community around her. In 2013, volume one of Rain was published in a book format.

Plot 
Rain Flaherty, a trans girl, moves away from her hometown and enrolls at St. Hallvard High School with the assistance of her aunt, Fara Bryer, who is a teacher at the school. Rain is finally ready to present solely femme in public; however, she encounters childhood friend Gavin Kurz, who knew her when she was still presenting masculine. To further complicate matters, she meets siblings Maria and Rudy Strongwell, the latter of whom accidentally discovers she is trans.

Characters

Rain and her family 

 Rain Flaherty - A teenage trans girl in her senior year of upper secondary school, Rain moves from her hometown and enrols at St. Hallvard's in Centerville to be able to present femme and avoid anyone she knows. Rain is the youngest of three siblings. She is a fan of Black Wings: Kaminari, an in-universe manga series. After briefly dating Rudy Strongwell, she realizes that she's gay, and later starts dating Emily Caston.
 Fara Bryer - Rain's aunt, and an art teacher at St. Hallvard's High School. Fara is bisexual, and dated Vincent Valverde in the past when he was still presenting as a woman.
 Kellen Flaherty - Rain's older sister, Kellen does not accept Rain being trans, and deadnames her. Kellen forcibly cuts Rain's hair whilst the latter is asleep, causing Rain to disown her. Has a twin, Aiken.
 Aiken Flaherty - Rain's older brother, Aiken was initially unaccepting of her but has since come around. He once dated Jessica Li, a trans woman, and reacted badly when she told him of that; since Rain's coming out, however, he's been working to reconcile with her. Aiken is twins with Kellen.

St. Hallvard's High School 

 Gavin Kurz - Rain's childhood friend.
 Maria Strongwell - Rudy's sister. She is an initially-closeted lesbian, before later coming out in front of the entire school.
 Rudy Strongwell - Maria's brother. He is openly gay, causing conflict with his disapproving parents. Rudy occasionally cross-dresses as Ruby.
 Emily Caston - Rain's classmate, Emily is initially presented as a popular, uncaring girl; beneath this cool exterior, though, is an abusive mother and an ex-boyfriend that gets her pregnant. Emily is actually a very sweet and caring girl, and supports Rain when the latter becomes estranged from her siblings. She eventually comes out as pansexual, and begins dating Rain.
 Arthur Feltman - A Catholic priest and the Dean of Students at St. Hallvard's. He is supportive of Rain; his younger brother Will is a trans man who lives on the other side of the country. Arthur views helping Rain partly as a way to reconcile with his brother.
 Quenton Morrison - A Catholic priest and the Headmaster at St. Hallvard's. He is a lawful evil character, committed to enforcing the school's moral code, and does not react well to queer people. Quenton is eventually fired and replaced with Arthur Feltman in the interim.

Other characters 

 Jessica Li - A trans woman and Aiken Flaherty's former girlfriend, Jessica met Aiken through an on-line dating service. When she came out as trans to Aiken, he broke up with her. Jessica makes up with Aiken and agrees to try out being friends again when she sees him making an effort not to deadname or misgender Rain or her in a conversation with Kellen.
 Vincent Valverde - A trans man who is Rain and Jessica's therapist. He is also Fara Bryer's former significant other.
Lydia Wynn Caston - Rain and Emily's daughter.

Release 
In December 2015, Jocelyn Samara DiDomenick hosted a holiday illustration featuring Rain and trans protagonists of many other webcomics, like Zoë in Venus Envy, Jess & Seb in 2punk4you, Carrie & Allison in Closetspace, Jesska in Manic Pixie Nightmare Girls and Stephie in Assigned Male.

On March 20, 2021, Samara announced an official French translation, by Mia Sadoch. It is updated weekly, and available for free, much like the original.

On March 15, 2022, Samara announced that the series had ended and that she would begin work on two other webcomics soon. Moonlight Wanderers is yet to be released and is currently in development.

On December 5th, 2022, Samara finally released My Impossible Soulmate, revealing it to be a standalone prequel to Rain.

Adaptations

Animated series 
In December 2020, Samara linked to a teaser trailer for an animated series of Rain, announcing that one was in production. Larissa Logan Robin Frost, also known by their handle LariUmbreon, announced that she would be voicing Rain in a post on Reddit. The official YouTube channel for the series described it as a "story for boys, girls, and everyone in between." 

In January 2021, DiDomenick revealed on Twitter that she had done "very little besides provide the story and character designs the animation is based on". On September 14, 2021, in a video re-upload of an instrumental track coupled with animation for the series, LariUmbreon announced the series cancellation, but did not specify the reason.

In April 2022, LariUmbreon, using the name "Robin", announced that the full animated adaption of Rain was discontinued but that she would continue posting short animated clips, linking to a crowdfunding campaign on Patreon. She included a 14-page description of what happened and why the full animated adaptation was discontinued.

Reception 
In TRANSforming Spaces: Transgender Webcomics as a Model for Transgender Empowerment and Representation within Library and Archive Spaces, Nami K. R. Hatfield (2015) argues that Rain derives its effectiveness from its "informed and sympathetic portrayal of transgender experiences", and notes that DiDomenick uses "the participatory methods of organized fandom" in order to interact with Rain's readers and fanbase. Participatory culture (a new media theory concept developed by scholar Henry Jenkins) in the Internet age, Hatfield contends, is precisely what makes Rain a reality - it enables smaller-scale works centred around non-mainstream experiences such as the trans experience to be shared easily. However, some were more critical, with a publication, Yes Homo, saying that the webcomic Venus Envy was better at "making a joke that isn’t based in transphobia."

The Boston Public Library ranks Rain at number 22 on a list of 31 comics to binge whilst stuck at home. Michele Kirichanskaya of ComicsVerse ranks it at number 2 on their list of 10 must-read LGBTQIA+ webcomics, praising its chibi art style whilst noting its initial lack of racial diversity. Librarian and folkorist Charlie McNabb described Rain as a "slice-of-life webcomic about a trans girl" and noted that the comic has a genderfluid character.

Notes

External links 

 Second teaser trailer for Rain: the Animated Series - https://www.youtube.com/watch?v=t547oBetHfo

References

2010 webcomic debuts
LGBT-related comics
LGBT-related webcomics
Transgender-related comics
Webcomics in print